The list of ship launches in 1855 includes a chronological list of some ships launched in 1855.



References

Sources

1855
Ship launches